The 1974 Norwegian Football Cup was the 69th edition of the Norwegian annual knockout football tournament. The Cup was won by Skeid after beating Viking in the cup final with the score 3–1. This was Skeid's eighth Norwegian Cup title.

First round

{{OneLegResult|Løkken||1–2|Kristiansund}}

|-
|colspan="3" style="background-color:#97DEFF"|Replay

|}

Second round

|-
|colspan="3" style="background-color:#97DEFF"|Replay

|}

Third round

|colspan="3" style="background-color:#97DEFF"|25 June 1974

|-
|colspan="3" style="background-color:#97DEFF"|26 June 1974

|-
|colspan="3" style="background-color:#97DEFF"|27 June 1974

|-
|colspan="3" style="background-color:#97DEFF"|28 June 1974

|-
|colspan="3" style="background-color:#97DEFF"|1 July 1974

|-
|colspan="3" style="background-color:#97DEFF"|2 July 1974

|-
|colspan="3" style="background-color:#97DEFF"|4 July 1974

|-
|colspan="3" style="background-color:#97DEFF"|Replay: 2 July 1974

|-
|colspan="3" style="background-color:#97DEFF"|Replay: 4 July 1974

|}

Fourth round

|colspan="3" style="background-color:#97DEFF"|18 August 1974

|-
|colspan="3" style="background-color:#97DEFF"|Replay: 28 August 1974

|}

Quarter-finals

|colspan="3" style="background-color:#97DEFF"|8 September 1974

|}

Semi-finals

|colspan="3" style="background-color:#97DEFF"|25 September 1974

|}

Final

Skeid's winning squad: Per Egil Nygård, Harald Gjedtjernet, Jan Birkelund, 
Per Chr. Olsen, Georg Hammer, Trygve Bornø, Frank Olafsen, Tor Egil Johansen,
Bjørn Skjønsberg, Stein Thunberg and Kai Arild Lund.

References
http://www.rsssf.no

Norwegian Football Cup seasons
Norway
Football Cup